The 2023 Philadelphia City Council elections will be held November 7, 2023 for elections of all seats in the Philadelphia City Council. The Democratic Party currently has a super-majority on the council. It will take place on the same day as the 2023 Philadelphia mayoral election and other local elections in the Commonwealth.

Background 
In 2019, Philadelphians re-elected Jim Kenney to a second term as Mayor and 4 new councilmembers joined the City Council. Katherine Gilmore Richardson and Isaiah Thomas were elected to At-Large Seats. Jamie Gauthier beat Incumbent Jannie Blackwell in the District 3 Primary and Kendra Brooks made history as the first Third Party City Councilmember in Philadelphia as a Working Families Party candidate.

In preparation for the 2023 Philadelphia mayoral election, 4 City Councilmembers resigned (Green, Domb, Parker, and Quiñones-Sánchez) to run or prepare to run for Mayor. While 3 were still considering running (Gym, Oh, and Bass). Council President Darrell Clarke announced a special election to replace the members.

6th District Councilmember Bobby Henon resigned after being convicted of corruption charges and was replaced with Michael Driscoll. 2nd District Councilmember Kenyatta Johnson was facing bribery charges in the months leading up to the election, but was acquitted on November 2, five days before Election Day.

1st District 
Incumbent Mark Squilla is running for re-election.

Democratic primary

Declared 
 Mark Squilla, incumbent councilor and majority whip

Withdrew 
 Amanda Mclllmurary, cofounder of Reclaim Philadelphia (running for an at-large seat)

Results

2nd District 
Incumbent Kenyatta Johnson is running for re-election, despite currently facing bribery charges.

Democratic primary

Declared 
 Aaron Humphrey, campaign manager
 Kenyatta Johnson, incumbent councilor
 Boogie Rose, community activist and former teacher

Results

3rd District 
Incumbent Jamie Gauthier is running for re-election.

Democratic primary

Declared 
 Jamie Gauthier, incumbent councilor

Withdrew 

 Jabari Jones, trade association president

Declined 
 Amen Brown, state representative (running for mayor)

Endorsements

Results

4th District 
Incumbent Curtis J. Jones Jr. is running for re-election.

Democratic primary

Declared 
 Curtis J. Jones Jr., incumbent councilor and majority leader
 Darrel Smith Jr., child welfare worker

Declined 

Results

5th District 
Incumbent Darrell L. Clarke is retiring.

Democratic primary

Declared 
 Patrick Griffin, attorney
 Jon Hankins, pastor and member of the Pennsylvania Democratic State Committee
 Isa Matin
 Jose Miranda, former state representative and convicted felon
 Aissia Richardson, staffer for state senator Sharif Street
 Curtis Wilkerson, former chief of staff to incumbent Darrell L. Clarke
 Jeffery Young Jr., attorney

Declined
 Darrell L. Clarke, incumbent councilor and council president (endorsed Wilkerson)

Endorsements

Results

6th District 
Incumbent Michael Driscoll is running for re-election.

Democratic primary

Declared 
 Michael Driscoll, incumbent councilor

Results

Republican primary

Did not qualify 
 Russell Kubach, realtor

7th District 
The 7th district seat was filled by Quetcy Lozada in the 2022 special election. Lozada is running for re-election.

Democratic primary

Declared 
 Andrés Celin, community organizer
 Quetcy Lozada, incumbent councilor

Endorsements

Results

Republican primary

Did not qualify 
 James Whitehead, nominee for this district in the 2022 special election

8th District 
Incumbent Cindy Bass is running for re-election.

Democratic primary

Declared
 Seth Anderson-Oberman, community organizer
 Cindy Bass, incumbent councilor

Declined
 Erika Almirón, candidate for an at-large seat in 2019 (running for an at-large seat)

Endorsements

Results

9th District 
The 9th district seat was filled by Anthony Phillips in the 2022 special election. Phillips is running for re-election.

Democratic primary

Declared 
 Janay Hawthorne, co-chair of New Leaders Council Philadelphia
 Anthony Phillips, incumbent councilor
 James Williams
 Yvette Young, Pottsgrove School District facilities director

Results

Republican primary

Withdrawn 
 Roslyn Ross, nominee for this district in the 2023 special election

10th District 
Incumbent Brian J. O'Neill is running for re-election.

Republican primary

Declared 
 Brian J. O'Neill, incumbent councilor and minority leader

Did not qualify 
 Roman Zhukhov, real estate professional and neighborhood watch group president

Results

Democratic primary

Declared 
 Gary Masino, president of Sheet Metal Workers Union Local 19

Results

At-Large Seats 
Philadelphia City Council has seven at-large seats, two of which must be represented by a minority party. Two at-large seats were temporarily vacant due to the resignations of Derek S. Green and Allan Domb to consider mayoral runs. They were filled in the special election on November 8, 2022. There will be three open seats in the 2023 election due to the resignations of Helen Gym and David Oh, and the retirement of Sharon Vaughn.

Each party may nominate five candidates for the general election. Voters can select up to five candidates in both the primary and general.

Democratic primary

Declared 
 Nina Ahmad, former deputy mayor, nominee for Pennsylvania Auditor General in 2020, and candidate for Lieutenant Governor in 2018
 Erika Almirón, community organizer and candidate for an at-large seat in 2019
 Jalon Alexander, attorney
 Sherrie Cohen, former tenants rights attorney and independent candidate for an at-large seat in 2019
 Luz Colón, former commissioner of the Governor's Advisory Commission on Latino Affairs (2015–2023)
 Wayne Dorsey
 Abu Edwards, political action chair of the NAACP Philadelphia chapter
 Katherine Gilmore Richardson, incumbent councilor
 Christopher Gladstone Booth, public school teacher
 Ogbonna Hagins, activist
 Jim Harrity, incumbent councilor
 Job Itzkowitz, director of Old City District
 John Kelly III, biomedical company CFO
 Rue Landau, community services attorney and former executive director of the Philadelphia Commission on Human Relations 
 Amanda McIllmurray, cofounder of Reclaim Philadelphia
 Matthew Modzelewski, customer service professional
 Daniel Orsino, housing counselor and Republican nominee for the 1st district in 2019
 Michelle Prettyman, educator and small business owner
 Clayton Price
 Charles Reyes, former Philadelphia Department of Education official
 Melissa Robbins
 Eryn Santamoor, former chief of staff to then-councilor Allan Domb
 Curtis Segers, assistant elementary school principal
 Derwood Selby
 George Stevenson
 Isaiah Thomas, incumbent councilor
 Max Tuttleman, philanthropist
 Donovan West, business owner and former CEO of the Pennsylvania African American Chamber of Commerce
 Deshawnda Williams

Did not qualify 
 Terrill Haigler, community organizer and former sanitation worker
 Ronald Martin, security guard and small business owner
 Billy McCann 
 Will Mega, activist and contestant on Season 1 of Big Brother USA
 Matthew Modzelewski, customer service professional

Withdrawn 
 Michael Galvan, nonprofit executive and former Philadelphia Director of Education Policy

Declined 
 Gary Masino, president of Sheet Metal Workers Union Local #19 (running for district 10)
 Sharon Vaughn, incumbent councilor (2023–present)

Endorsements

Results

Republican primary

Declared 
 Frank Cristinzio
 Gary Grisafi, music teacher
 Jim Hasher, real estate agent, bar owner, and nominee for an at-large seat in the 2023 special election
 Mary Jane Kelly
 Drew Murray, Philadelphia Republican ward leader and nominee for an at-large seat in the 2023 special election
 Sam Oropeza, real estate professional, mixed martial artist, and nominee for Pennsylvania Senate's 5th district in 2022 special election

Declined 
 David Oh, at-large councilor (2012-2023) (running for mayor)

Endorsements

Results

Working Families Party

Declared 
 Kendra Brooks, incumbent councilor
 Nicolas O’Rourke, director of the Pennsylvania Working Families Party and nominee in 2019

References

2023 United States local elections
2023 Pennsylvania elections
Philadelphia City Council elections